Zvi Renner (born 1910, died 3 May 1990) was an Israeli politician who served as a member of the Knesset for Likud between 1981 and 1984.

Biography
Born in Galicia in 1910, Renner was educated in a yeshiva. He joined the Polish branch of the General Zionists youth movement, and made aliyah to Mandatory Palestine in 1933. He joined kibbutz Ahva, located near Rehovot, which was associated with the General Zionists. He worked in construction and for Tel Aviv city council, becoming chairman of the personnel department and a member of its directorate.

In 1969 he was elected onto Tel Aviv city council. In 1980 he became chairman of the Liberal Workers Union, and also chaired the Liberal Party secretariat (the General Zionists merged into the Liberal Party in 1961), as well as serving as its treasurer. In 1981 he was elected to the Knesset on the Likud list (then an alliance of the Liberal Party, Herut and other right-wing factions), but lost his seat in the 1984 elections.

He died in 1990.

References

External links

1910 births
1990 deaths
Jews from Galicia (Eastern Europe)
Polish emigrants to Mandatory Palestine
Jews in Mandatory Palestine
Israeli civil servants
General Zionists politicians
Liberal Party (Israel) politicians
Likud politicians
Members of the 10th Knesset (1981–1984)